The freguesias (civil parishes) of Portugal are listed in by municipality according to the following format:
 concelho
 freguesias

Paços de Ferreira
Arreigada
Carvalhosa
Codessos
Eiriz
Ferreira
Figueiró
Frazão
Freamunde
Lamoso
Meixomil
Modelos
Paços de Ferreira
Penamaior
Raimonda
Sanfins de Ferreira
Seroa

Palmela
Marateca
Palmela
Pinhal Novo
Poceirão
Quinta do Anjo

Pampilhosa da Serra
Cabril
Dornelas do Zêzere
Fajão
Janeiro de Baixo
Machio
Pampilhosa da Serra
Pessegueiro
Portela do Fojo
Unhais-o-Velho
Vidual

Paredes
Aguiar de Sousa
Astromil
Baltar
Beire
Besteiros
Bitarães
Castelões de Cepeda
Cete
Cristelo
Duas Igrejas
Gandra
Gondalães
Lordelo
Louredo
Madalena
Mouriz
Parada de Todeia
Rebordosa
Recarei
Sobreira
Sobrosa
Vandoma
Vila Cova de Carros
Vilela

Paredes de Coura
Agualonga
Bico
Castanheira
Cossourado
Coura
Cristelo
Cunha
Ferreira
Formariz
Infesta
Insalde
Linhares
Mozelos
Padornelo
Parada
Paredes de Coura
Porreiras
Resende
Romarigães
Rubiães
Vascões

Pedrógão Grande
Graça
Pedrógão Grande
Vila Facaia

Penacova
Carvalho
Figueira de Lorvão
Friúmes
Lorvão
Oliveira do Mondego
Paradela
Penacova
São Paio de Mondego
São Pedro de Alva
Sazes do Lorvão
Travanca do Mondego

Penafiel
Abragão
Boelhe
Bustelo
Cabeça Santa
Canelas
Capela (Penafiel)
Castelões
Croca

Eja
Figueira
Fonte Arcada
Galegos
Guilhufe
Irivo
Lagares
Luzim
Marecos
Milhundos

Oldrões
Paço de Sousa
Paredes
Penafiel
Perozelo
Pinheiro
Portela
Rans
Recezinhos (São Mamede)
Recezinhos (São Martinho)
Rio de Moinhos
Rio Mau
Santa Marta
Santiago de Subarrifana
Sebolido
Urrô
Valpedre
Vila Cova

Penalva do Castelo
Antas
Castelo de Penalva
Esmolfe
Germil
Ínsua
Lusinde
Mareco
Matela
Pindo
Real
Sezures
Trancozelos
Vila Cova do Covelo

Penamacor
Águas
Aldeia de João Pires
Aldeia do Bispo
Aranhas
Bemposta
Benquerença
Meimão
Meimoa
Pedrógão de São Pedro www.pedrogao.com
Penamacor
Salvador
Vale da Senhora da Póvoa

Penedono
Antas
Beselga
Castainço
Granja
Ourozinho
Penedono
Penela da Beira
Póvoa de Penela
Souto

Penela
Cumeeira
Espinhal
Penela (Santa Eufémia)
Penela (São Miguel)
Podentes
Rabaçal

Peniche
Atouguia da Baleia
Ferrel
Peniche (Ajuda)
Peniche (Conceição)
Peniche (São Pedro)
Serra d' El-Rei

Peso da Régua
Canelas
Covelinhas
Fontelas
Galafura
Godim
Loureiro
Moura Morta
Peso da Régua
Poiares
Sedielos
Vilarinho dos Freires
Vinhós

Pinhel
Alverca da Beira
Atalaia
Azevo
Bogalhal
Bouça Cova
Cerejo
Cidadelhe
Ervas Tenras
Ervedosa
Freixedas
Gouveia
Lamegal
Lameiras
Manigoto
Pala
Pereiro
Pinhel
Pínzio
Pomares
Póvoa d' El-Rei
Safurdão
Santa Eufémia
Sorval
Souro Pires
Valbom
Vale de Madeira
Vascoveiro

Pombal
Abiul
Albergaria dos Doze
Almagreira
Carnide
Carriço
Guia
Ilha
Louriçal
Mata Mourisca
Meirinhas
Pelariga
Pombal
Redinha
Santiago de Litém
São Simão de Litém
Vermoil
Vila Chã

Ponta Delgada (Azores)
Ajuda da Bretanha
Arrifes
Candelária
Capelas
Covoada
Fajã de Baixo
Fajã de Cima
Fenais da Luz
Feteiras
Ginetes
Livramento
Mosteiros
Pilar da Bretanha
Relva
Remédios
Santa Bárbara
Santa Clara
São José
São Pedro
São Roque
São Sebastião
Santo António
São Vicente Ferreira
Sete Cidades

Ponta do Sol (Madeira)
Canhas
Madalena do Mar
Ponta do Sol

Ponte da Barca
Azias
Boivães
Bravães
Britelo
Crasto
Cuide de Vila Verde
Entre Ambos-os-Rios
Ermida
Germil
Grovelas
Lavradas
Lindoso
Nogueira
Oleiros
Paço Vedro de Magalhães
Ponte da Barca
Ruivos
Sampriz
Touvedo (Salvador)
Touvedo (São Lourenço)
Vade (São Pedro)
Vade (São Tomé)
Vila Chã (Santiago)
Vila Chã (São João Baptista)
Vila Nova de Muía

Ponte de Lima
Anais
Arca
Arcos
Arcozelo
Ardegão
Bárrio
Beiral do Lima
Bertiandos
Boalhosa
Brandara
Cabaços
Cabração
Calheiros
Calvelo
Cepões
Correlhã
Estorãos
Facha
Feitosa
Fojo Lobal
Fontão
Fornelos
Freixo
Friastelas
Gaifar
Gandra
Gemieira
Gondufe
Labruja
Labrujó
Mato
Moreira do Lima
Navió
Poiares
Ponte de Lima
Queijada
Rebordões (Santa Maria)
Rebordões (Souto)
Refóios do Lima
Rendufe
Ribeira
Sá
Sandiães
Santa Comba
Santa Cruz do Lima
Seara
Serdedelo
Vilar das Almas
Vilar do Monte
Vitorino das Donas
Vitorino dos Piães

Ponte de Sor
Foros de Arrão
Galveias
Longomel
Montargil
Ponte de Sor
Tramaga
Vale de Açor

Portalegre
Alagoa
Alegrete
Carreiras
Fortios
Reguengo
Ribeira de Nisa
São Julião
São Lourenço
Sé
Urra

Portel
Alqueva
Amieira
Monte do Trigo
Oriola
Portel
Santana
São Bartolomeu do Outeiro
Vera Cruz

Portimão
Alvor
Mexilhoeira Grande
Portimão

Porto

Until 28 January 2013 
Aldoar
Bonfim
Campanhã
Cedofeita
Foz do Douro
Lordelo do Ouro
Massarelos
Miragaia
Nevogilde
Paranhos
Ramalde
Santo Ildefonso
São Nicolau
Sé
Vitória

Effective 29 January 2013 

 Aldoar, Foz do Douro e Nevogilde
 Bonfim
 Campanhã
 Cedofeita, Santo Ildefonso, Sé, Miragaia, São Nicolau e Vitória
 Lordelo do Ouro e Massarelos
 Paranhos
 Ramalde

Porto de Mós

Until 28 January 2013 
Alcaria
Alqueidão da Serra
Alvados
Arrimal
Calvaria de Cima
Juncal
Mendiga
Mira de Aire
Pedreiras
Porto de Mós (São João Baptista)
Porto de Mós (São Pedro)
São Bento
Serro Ventoso

Effective 29 January 2013 

 Alqueidão da Serra
 Alvados e Alcaria
 Arrimal e Mendiga
 Calvaria de Cima
 Juncal
 Mira de Aire
 Pedreiras
 Porto de Mós - São João Baptista e São Pedro
 São Bento
 Serro Ventoso

Porto Moniz (Madeira)
Achadas da Cruz
Porto Moniz
Ribeira da Janela
Seixal

Porto Santo (Madeira)
Porto Santo

Póvoa de Lanhoso
Águas Santas
Ajude
Brunhais
Calvos
Campos
Covelas
Esperança
Ferreiros
Fonte Arcada
Frades
Friande
Galegos
Garfe
Geraz do Minho
Lanhoso
Louredo
Monsul
Moure
Oliveira
Póvoa de Lanhoso (N Senhora do Amparo)
Rendufinho
Santo Emilião
São João de Rei
Serzedelo
Sobradelo da Goma
Taíde
Travassos
Verim
Vilela

Póvoa de Varzim
A Ver-o-Mar
Aguçadoura
Amorim
Argivai
Balasar
Beiriz
Estela
Laundos
Navais
Póvoa de Varzim
Rates
Terroso

Povoação (Azores)
Água Retorta
Faial da Terra
Furnas
Nossa Senhora dos Remédios
Povoação
Ribeira Quente

Praia da Vitória (Azores)
 Agualva
 Biscoitos
 Cabo da Praia
 Fonte do Bastardo
 Fontinhas
 Lajes
 Porto Martins
 Praia da Vitória
 Quatro Ribeiras
 São Brás
 Vila Nova

Proença-a-Nova
Alvito da Beira
Montes da Senhora
Proença-a-Nova
São Pedro do Esteval
Sobreira Formosa

P